Tom Wrigley (born 13 August 1992 in Chirk) is a British racing driver who currently races for RACE-LAB in the all new McLaren Artura GT4 within the British GT.

Racing record

Career summary

References

External links
 http://www.tomwrigley.co.uk/
 https://www.britishgt.com/news/907/the-lions-barber-collective-and-fastr-join-forces-with-race-lab-for-british-gt4-assault

1992 births
Living people
Porsche Carrera Cup GB drivers
Ginetta GT4 Supercup drivers